"Everybody Knows" is a song written by Matraca Berg and Gary Harrison, and recorded by American country music artist Trisha Yearwood. It was released in October 1996 as the second single from her album of the same name. The song reached number 3 on the US Billboard Hot Country Singles & Tracks chart in February 1997 and number 1 on the RPM Country Tracks chart in Canada.

Music video
The music video was directed by Gerry Wenner and premiered in November 1996.

Chart performance
"Everybody Knows" debuted at number 57 on the U.S. Billboard Hot Country Singles & Tracks for the week of November 9, 1996.

Year-end charts

References

1996 singles
1996 songs
Trisha Yearwood songs
Songs written by Matraca Berg
Songs written by Gary Harrison
Song recordings produced by Garth Fundis
MCA Records singles